Tippett is a populated place in White Pine County, Nevada.

History 
Tippett was the location of a U. S. Post Office, from May 1896 to Dec 1913, and from June 1914 to June 1926.   It was also located along the original 1913 alignment of the Lincoln Highway.

Today
Tippett seems to be the site of a farming enterprise.

External links
 History of Tippett

References

Populated places in White Pine County, Nevada